Joe Pincus (born 24 July 1996) is an Australian rugby sevens player. Pincus was a member of the Australian men's rugby seven's squad at the Tokyo 2020 Olympics. The team came third in their pool round and then lost to Fiji 19-nil in the quarterfinal.

Super Rugby statistics

References

External links

itsrugby Profile

1996 births
Living people
Male rugby sevens players
Olympic rugby sevens players of Australia
Rugby sevens players at the 2020 Summer Olympics
Australian rugby union players
Australian rugby sevens players
Rugby union wings
Rugby union fullbacks
Melbourne Rebels players
Place of birth missing (living people)